Princess Isabelle of Orléans (Isabelle Marie Laure Mercédès Ferdinande; 7 May 1878 – 21 April 1961) was a member of the French Orleanist royal family and by marriage Duchess of Guise.

Biography

Early life
Isabelle was born at the Château d'Eu, Eu , France, the third daughter and fifth child of Prince Philippe, Count of Paris and Infanta Maria Isabel of Spain. In 1886, when she was eight years old, a law was promulgated by the Third Republic that effectively exiled all dynasties who formerly ruled France, whereupon she and her family moved to England.

Marriage and issue
As a young woman, Isabelle had many suitors, chief among them being the future Albert I of Belgium. Albert, however, was forced to end the courtship under pressure from his uncle King Leopold II, who feared that a marriage to the daughter of an exiled pretender to the French throne would result in backlash from the republican government in Paris.

On 30 October 1899, Isabelle married her first cousin Prince Jean, Duke of Guise (1874–1940). Jean was the son of prince Robert, Duke of Chartres (1840–1910) and Françoise d'Orléans (1844–1925). Upon the death of her brother, Philippe of Orléans, Duke of Orléans, claimant to the throne of France as "Philip VIII", the Duke of Guise became, at least for his Orleanist supporters, titular king of France as "Jean III". The title was disputed by members of the Spanish Anjou branch of the family, descended from Louis XIV.

The couple had four children:
Princess Isabelle of Orléans (1900–1983). First married in 1923 to Bruno, Count of Harcourt (1899–1930) and then to Prince Pierre Murat in 1934.
Princess Françoise of Orléans (1902–1953). Married to Prince Christopher of Greece in 1929. He was a son of King George I of Greece and Olga, Queen of Greece. They were parents of Prince Michael of Greece.
Princess Anne of Orléans (1906–1986). She married Prince Amedeo of Savoy, 3rd Duke of Aosta in 1927.
Henri, Count of Paris (1908–1999).  He married Princess Isabelle of Orléans-Braganza in 1931.

Princess Isabelle died in Larache, Morocco.

Ancestry

References

|-

1878 births
1961 deaths
19th-century French people
20th-century French people
19th-century French women
20th-century French women
Princesses of France (Orléans)
People from Eu, Seine-Maritime
Dames of the Order of Saint Isabel
Burials at the Chapelle royale de Dreux
Children of Prince Philippe, Count of Paris